Zomba Airport  is an airport serving Zomba, Malawi.

See also
Transport in Malawi
List of airports in Malawi

References

External links
 OpenStreetMap - Zomba
 OurAirports - Zomba

Airports in Malawi
Buildings and structures in Southern Region, Malawi